Arashiro ( or ) is a Ryukyuan surname. Its alternative readings include Aragusuku, Aragushiku and Shinjō. Notable people with the surname include:

 Beni Arashiro (安良城 紅), Japanese singer
 Kiwako Arashiro (新城 貴和子), Japanese model
 Yukiya Arashiro (新城 幸也), Japanese racer

See also 

 Okinawan name
 Okinawa Prefecture

References 
Okinawan surnames
Japanese-language surnames
Surnames